The Heiress of the Count of Monte Cristo is a 1919 German silent film directed by Frederic Zelnik and starring Lya Mara, Werner Funck, and Vilma von Mayburg.

The film's sets were designed by the art director Artur Günther.

Cast
Lya Mara as Helene Montfort
Werner Funck as Jean de Renard
Vilma von Mayburg as Frau von Renard
Aenderly Lebius
Hermann Vallentin as Advokat Dubarry
Hugo Falke as Richard de Renard
Harry Berber as Herr Scharlan
Tonia Gudowicy as Tochter Renard
Edwin Schäfer

References

External links

Films of the Weimar Republic
Films directed by Frederic Zelnik
German silent feature films
German black-and-white films